Ronald L. Rothstein  (born December 27, 1942) is an American former professional basketball coach and  college basketball player, who has led many different NBA teams.  He served as the first head coach for the Miami Heat, and later coached the Detroit Pistons. He has also coached in the Women's National Basketball Association (WNBA). In 2007-08, he also filled in for Pat Riley as an interim coach for the Heat.

Early life
Born in Bronxville, New York,  Rothstein graduated from Roosevelt High School of Yonkers, New York in 1960 and played college basketball at the University of Rhode Island for the Rams. At Rhode Island, Rothstein was team captain as a senior and graduated in 1964 with a degree in physical education. In 1966, Rothstein earned his master's in physical education from Hunter College.

Family

Ron Rothstein has a wife, Olivia, two children, Dana and David, and four grandchildren, Lucas, Hailey, Aidan, and Ava Jade.

Career
Rothstein began his coaching career in 1966 at Eastchester High School in Eastchester, New York and would remain until 1976. During the summer of 1967, he was the athletic director at Camp Ma-Ho-Ge in Bethel, New York. He then became assistant coach at NCAA Division III Upsala College for one season and then worked as head coach at New Rochelle High School of New Rochelle, New York from 1976 to 1978. Rothstein returned to Eastchester High for the 1978–79 season and coached varsity basketball and physical education thru June 1983.

In 1979, Rothstein signed as a scout for the Atlanta Hawks and was named assistant coach in July 1983.  He was signed as an assistant for the Detroit Pistons in 1986 before becoming the first coach in Heat history (1988).

Rothstein coached the Heat for three seasons, never leading them to a winning record. Rothstein became a television commentator for the Pistons as well as for the NBA on NBC all during the 1990-91 season. Detroit eventually hired him as their head coach for a season, but he was eventually fired. In 1993, he was hired as an assistant coach for the Cleveland Cavaliers, where he stayed six seasons. In 2000, he was hired as head coach and general manager for the WNBA's Miami Sol, where he stayed during the franchise's entire existence (2000–2003). In 2003, he was hired by the Indiana Pacers as an assistant coach.  Rothstein would eventually return to the Heat as an assistant.

On January 3, 2007, Rothstein was named as the interim head coach of the Miami Heat in place of Pat Riley, who took a leave of absence for knee and hip surgery.

Head coaching record

NBA

|-
| style="text-align:left;"|Miami
| style="text-align:left;"|
| 82 || 15 || 67 ||  || style="text-align:center;"|6th in Midwest || — || — || — || —
| style="text-align:center;"|Missed Playoffs
|-
| style="text-align:left;"|Miami
| style="text-align:left;"|
| 82 || 18 || 64 ||  || style="text-align:center;"|5th in Atlantic || — || — || — || —
| style="text-align:center;"|Missed Playoffs
|-
| style="text-align:left;"|Miami
| style="text-align:left;"|
| 82 || 24 || 58 ||  || style="text-align:center;"|7th in Atlantic || — || — || — || —
| style="text-align:center;"|Missed Playoffs
|-
| style="text-align:left;"|Detroit
| style="text-align:left;"|
| 82 || 40 || 42 ||  || style="text-align:center;"|6th in Central || — || — || — || —
| style="text-align:center;"|Missed Playoffs
|- class="sortbottom"
| style="text-align:left;"|Career
| || 328 || 97 || 231 ||  || || — || — || — || — ||
|}

WNBA

|-
| align="left" |MIA
| align="left" |
|32||13||19|||| align="center" |6th in East||–||–||–||–
| align="center" |Missed Playoffs
|-
| align="left" |MIA
| align="left" |
|32||20||12|||| align="center |3rd in East||3||1||2||
| align="center" |Lost in Conference Semifinals
|-
| align="left" |MIA
| align="left" |
|32||15||17|||| align="center" |6th in East||–||–||–||–
| align="center" |Missed Playoffs
|-class="sortbottom"
| align="left" |Career
| ||96||48||48|||| ||3||1||2||||

References

External links
 WNBA.com coach file: Ron Rothstein
 NBA.com coach file: Ron Rothstein

1942 births
Living people
American basketball scouts
American men's basketball coaches
American men's basketball players
American women's basketball coaches
Atlanta Hawks assistant coaches
Atlanta Hawks scouts
Basketball coaches from New York (state)
Basketball players from New York (state)
Cleveland Cavaliers assistant coaches
Detroit Pistons assistant coaches
Detroit Pistons head coaches
High school basketball coaches in the United States
Hunter College alumni
Indiana Pacers assistant coaches
Jewish American sportspeople
Jewish men's basketball players
Miami Heat assistant coaches
Miami Heat head coaches
Miami Sol coaches
People from Bronxville, New York
Rhode Island Rams men's basketball players
Sportspeople from Yonkers, New York
Upsala Vikings men's basketball coaches
Women's National Basketball Association executives
21st-century American Jews